Hugh L. Fontaine (November 7, 1895 – June 1978) was an American fighter pilot during World War I and a Thoroughbred racehorse trainer. He was the trainer of the winning horse Needles in the 1956 Kentucky Derby and the 1956 Belmont Stakes.

Born in New Orleans, Hugh Fontaine grew up in Memphis, Tennessee.

Military career
During World War I Lieutenant Fontaine served in France with the United States Army Air Force. By an Act of Congress, on July 9, 1818, he was awarded the Distinguished Service Cross for "extraordinary heroism" while serving with the 49th Aero Squadron, 2nd Pursuit Group.

Thoroughbred racehorse trainer
Fontaine worked as stable manager for William R. Coe before 1937 when he took over from Robert Smith as the head trainer for the Brookmeade Stable of Isabel Dodge Sloane. Among his successes while there, he conditioned Handcuff to 1938 American Champion Three-Year-Old Filly  honors.

References

1895 births
1978 deaths
American horse trainers
United States Army Air Service pilots of World War I
United States Army Air Forces officers
Recipients of the Distinguished Service Cross (United States)
People from New Orleans
People from Memphis, Tennessee